Sir Brian Piers Shaw (21 March 1933 - 5 February 2011) was a British executive who served as chairman of the International Chamber of Shipping (1987-1992), the president of the General Council of British Shipping (1985-1986), and the chairman of the AA during its demutualisation and sale to Centrica in 1998.

Shaw was knighted in 1986.

References

1933 births
2011 deaths
British businesspeople
20th-century British businesspeople